Shahan Ali Mohsin (born 13 July 2004) is an Indian racing driver from India, an Asia Max Karting Champion and two-time JK Tyre National Racing Championship in the Micro Max category.

Racing career

2015 
Shahan won 6 races out of 10 (finals and pre-finals) and finishing second in another three. The final round was held at the Shah Alam Karting Circuit in Malaysia, driving for the Asia Max outfit iS Racing run by Imran Shahrom.

2016 
In his final Micro Max (8–12 years) category he became the first-ever Indian to win the Asian Karting title in any category. He successfully defended his Micro Max National title in two championships, the JK Tyre Meco Motorsport Rotax Max Kart Open and JK Tyre National Rotax Max Karting Championship. Shahan also participated in his first European race, the Rotax Euro Finals held in Austria.

2017 
In 2017 Shahan moved up to the Junior category in the national championship, Shahan participated in few European rounds as well on one-off basis, with his best result being a fourth place in the Rotax Grand Finals at Speedworld Circuit in Austria.

Personal life 
Mohsin's father, Shahroo Mohsin is a shoe exporter based in Agra. Shahan is a student of Delhi Public School, Agra. His favourite F1 driver and idol is Spaniard Fernando Alonso.

See also
 JK Tyre National Racing Championship

References

2004 births
Living people
Indian racing drivers
MRF Challenge Formula 2000 Championship drivers